Manilkara bolivarensis is a species of plant in the family Sapotaceae. It is endemic to Venezuela.

References

bolivarensis
Plants described in 1990
Vulnerable plants
Flora of Venezuela
Taxonomy articles created by Polbot